Evmorfia Dona (also written as Evmorfia Ntona, Ευμορφία Ντώνα; born 23 August 1984, in Grevena) is a retired Greek individual and group rhythmic  gymnast. She represents her nation at international competitions.

She participated at the 2000 Summer Olympics in Sydney. She also competed at world championships, including at the 1999, 2005 and 2007  World Rhythmic Gymnastics Championships.

References

External links

1984 births
Living people
Greek rhythmic gymnasts
Sportspeople from Grevena
Gymnasts at the 2000 Summer Olympics
Olympic gymnasts of Greece